Oreste Piro is a dynamical systems theorist and biophysicist. He is at the Universitat de les Illes Balears (UIB) in Palma de Mallorca.

Piro is known for work including his studies of forced relaxation oscillators such as the exactly-solvable PiroGon oscillator, the dynamics of passive scalars in chaotic advection of fluids, bailout embeddings, the influence of fluid mechanics on the development of vertebrate left-right asymmetry, and the self-tuned critical network model

References 

1954 births
Living people
People from Palma de Mallorca
Spanish biophysicists
Argentine biophysicists
Argentine physicists
Chaos theorists
Theorists
Complex systems scientists
Academic staff of the University of the Balearic Islands
Dynamical systems theorists